Alex Chu Chi Kwong (born 29 August 1960) is a Hong Kong football manager and former player. He is the head coach of Hong Kong Premier League club Kitchee.

Chu holds an AFC “Pro” License coaching certification.

Playing career
Born in Hong Kong, Chu played for Hong Kong First Division clubs Sea Bee and Sing Tao during his playing career. While playing for Sing Tao, Chu lifted the Viceroy Cup twice, during the 1994–95 and 1996–97 seasons.

Coaching career
Following retirement from playing, Chu took over the managerial position at Fukien in 2001. Despite working with a limited budget, Fukien were able to stave off relegation from First Division during Chu's first three years at the club while occasionally scoring upset victories over table toppers Happy Valley and Sun Hei. During his tenure, he discovered and signed talent players such as Tong Kin Man, Zhang Chunhui and Wong Chin Hung.

After a disappointing 8th place finish during the 2004-05 season, Fukien were not originally relegated from the First Division. However, the club chose to voluntarily relegate themselves to the Second Division and Chu left the club.

In 2006, Chu joined Kitchee as a coach. Players such as Ngan Lok Fung, Li Ngai Hoi, Tsang Kin Fong trained under his tutelage at Kitchee's academy and later became professional footballers. After the departure of Dejan Antonić on 27 December 2007, Chu was asked to become the caretaker. His managerial debut for Kitchee came on 11 January 2008 which resulted in a 1–1 draw against Eastern.

On 14 November 2013, manager Àlex Gómez suddenly resigned his position. Chu and Cheng Siu Chung were named co-caretakers of the club until the end of the 2013–14 season. Both Chu and Cheng were responsible for leading Kitchee to an undefeated season and the league title.

On 5 March 2016, history was repeated as Abraham García suddenly resigned as manager of Kitchee. Chu was named caretaker for the remainder of the season.

Ahead of the 2016–17 season, Chu was named the permanent manager as well as Director of Football for the club. Kitchee were rewarded for their decision as Chu managed the first team to a domestic treble, capturing the Premier League, the Hong Kong FA Cup and the Senior Shield. The only blemish on their historic season was a 2017 AFC Champions League qualifying playoff round loss to Ulsan Hyundai. Kitchee had taken the Korean club to penalties but came up just short of qualifying for the Champions League group stage for the first time. For his achievements, Chu won the Hong Kong Coach of the Year award for 2017.

On 3 July 2019, Chu stepped down from his head coaching duties at Kitchee.

On 11 August 2019, Chu was appointed as an assistant to Hong Kong head coach Mixu Paatelainen until the end of the year.

On 23 March 2020, Chu was named as caretaker of Kitchee until the end of the 2019–20 season following Blaž Slišković's decision to step down as head coach.

On 3 March 2022, Chu was reappointed as the head coach of Kitchee.

Honours

As a player
Sing Tao
Hong Kong Senior Shield: 1991–92
Viceroy Cup: 1994–95, 1996–97

As a coach
Kitchee
Hong Kong First Division/Premier League: 2013–14 (co-caretaker), 2016–17, 2017–18, 2019–20
Hong Kong Senior Challenge Shield: 2016–17, 2018–19
Hong Kong FA Cup: 2016–17, 2017–18, 2018–19
Hong Kong Sapling Cup: 2017–18, 2019–20
Hong Kong League Cup: 2015–16

Individual
 Hong Kong Coach of the Year (3): 2017, 2018, 2021

Footnotes

References

External links

Living people
1966 births
Hong Kong footballers
Association football defenders
Kitchee SC players
Hong Kong football managers
Kitchee SC managers